Sinhala Ravaya is a Sinhalese Buddhist nationalist political party. It along with the Bodu Bala Sena are in the Sinhalese ultranationalist campaign Sinha-Le. The General Secretary of the party is Shalika Luckpriya Perera .

References

External links 
 

Anti-Christian sentiment in Asia
Buddhist organisations based in Sri Lanka
Buddhist nationalism
Sinhalese nationalist organisations
Far-right politics in Asia
Islamophobia in Sri Lanka